Hekou is a district of the city of Dongying, Shandong province, China. As of the census of 2010, there were 247,595 people, and 90,092 families residing in Hekou.

Administrative divisions
As 2012, this district is divided to 1 subdistrict, 3 towns and 3 townships.
Subdistricts
Hekou Subdistrict

Towns
Yihe
Xianhe
Gudao

Townships
Xinhu Township
Taiping Township
Liuhe Township

Climate

References

External links 
 Official homepage

County-level divisions of Shandong